Ingrid Lynn Moll (born April 17, 1973) is a Judge of the Connecticut Appellate Court.

Biography 

Moll earned her Bachelor of Arts in Political Science and French in 1995 from Wheaton College.

She subsequently received her Juris Doctor from the University of Connecticut School of Law in 1999.  While in law school, Moll served as Editor-in-Chief of the Connecticut Law Review.

Moll has worked at Motley Rice, LLC, McCarter & English, LLP, and Cummings & Lockwood, LLC.

She  has been recognized for excellence in environmental litigation.

She was appointed to the Superior Court by Governor Dan Malloy in 2014.

She was nominated to the Connecticut Appellate Court by Governor Dan Malloy on May 3, 2018. Her current term expires in 2026.

References

External links 
 Official Biography on State of Connecticut Judicial Branch website
 

1973 births
Living people
20th-century American women lawyers
20th-century American lawyers
21st-century American women lawyers
21st-century American lawyers
21st-century American judges
Judges of the Connecticut Appellate Court
Wheaton College (Illinois) alumni
Superior court judges in the United States
University of Connecticut faculty
University of Connecticut School of Law alumni